Filipe Miguel Delgadinho Albuquerque (born 13 June 1985) is a Portuguese professional racing driver, currently driving a Acura ARX-05 in the IMSA SportsCar Championship for Wayne Taylor Racing, and an Oreca 07 in the FIA World Endurance Championship for United Autosports. He has claimed a LMP2 class title at the 2019–20 FIA World Endurance Championship, an LMP2 class win at the 2020 24 Hours of Le Mans, and overall wins at the 24 Hours of Daytona in 2018 and 2021.

Career

Filipe Albuquerque started his motor racing career in karting in 1993, "I started karting as a joke, but it quickly became more and more serious" Albuquerque recalled, "It's really hard to get sponsorship to go racing. Without Red Bull I would probably be at home studying" he added. The young Portuguese driver went on to win two national karting titles before moving up to Spanish Formula Three with the help of Red Bull. But later, Albuquerque was moved up to the Formula Renault, "a driver was fired from Red Bull" The Portuguese commented, "and I was told I would do the Renault 2.0-litre race in Zolder." Albuquerque was the fastest driver for the team during the race and so became the permanent replacement and was also called into the Formula Renault German series.

Albuquerque finished sixth in the Spanish Formula Three championship, fifth in the Formula Renault Eurocup and third in the Formula Renault Germany series, finishing as a highest positioned rookie in all three championships. In 2006, Albuquerque raced in two championships, the Formula Renault Eurocup championship and the North European Formula Renault championship, where he won the Drivers' title in both series.

For 2007, Albuquerque entered the Formula Renault 3.5 Series championship with the Epsilon Euskadi team, and finished fourth in the drivers' championship. He was also chosen as replacement of Ernesto Viso in the Silverstone round of GP2 Series, following the Venezuelan's accident at Magny-Cours. Albuquerque remained in Formula Renault 3.5 for 2008, but only competed in four races, as he focussed on the A1 Grand Prix series.

Albuquerque made his A1 GP début in the 2007–08 season, replacing João Urbano at A1 Team Portugal mid-season. He finished every race he started in the points, including three podium finishes, and the team finished eleventh in that year's championship. He returned for the 2008–09 season as the team's sole driver, and finished third overall after a campaign which saw him take Portugal's first series win, in China. He was retained for the 2009–10 season, but the series ran into financial trouble and the new season was cancelled before it began.

With his single-seater career prospects looking bleak, Albuquerque moved to Italian GT racing when it became apparent that the A1 GP series had died. He moved to the Italian GT3 Championship for part of the 2009 season, driving an Audi R8 LMS. He also made an appearance at one of the race meetings for the 2009 Superstars Series season, a touring car championship, and finished second in both races, driving an Audi RS4. For 2010, he competed in the Italian GT3 Championship full-time, finishing as joint-runner up in the series with his Audi R8 LMS co-driver Marco Bonanomi, behind champion Gianluca Roda in a Porsche 997 GT3. He also made another Superstars guest appearance for Audi, winning one of the races at his home event, held at the Autódromo Internacional do Algarve.

Albuquerque competed in the 2010 Race of Champions event at Düsseldorf. He was partnered with Portuguese countryman Álvaro Parente in the Cup of Nations, where they were knocked out in the group stage. In the individual Champion of Champions competition, however, Albuquerque scored a surprise victory, defeating Formula One champion Sebastian Vettel in the semi-final and multiple World Rally Champion Sébastien Loeb in the final.

In 2011, Albuquerque competed in the Deutsche Tourenwagen Masters, driving a 2008-spec Audi A4, also entering the Blancpain Endurance Series in an Audi R8 entered by Belgian team WRT, which finished second overall on the final standings.

In 2013, Albuquerque made his debut in the 24 Hours of Daytona driving an Audi R8 Grand-Am for Alex Job Racing in the GT class. He won the class as part of an Audi 1-2 finish.

In 2014, Albuquerque was no longer racing in the Deutsche Tourenwagen Masters. He raced in the European Le Mans Series in the LMP2 category and finished as runner up on the drivers' standings. He was also a part of Audi's official team for the 2014 24 Hours of Le Mans.

Albuquerque nearly won the 2017 24 Hours of Daytona, leading the final stages of the race before contact with Ricky Taylor caused him to spin out with seven minutes to go; Albuquerque subsequently ran down Taylor on the last lap of the race but was unable to make the pass, losing by 0.671 seconds.

Highlights
FIA WEC (LMP2): Champion (2019–20)
24 Hours of Le Mans: LMP2 Winner (2020)
European Le Mans Series: Champion (2020)
Race of Champions: Winner (2010)
Eurocup Formula Renault 2.0: Champion (2006)
Formula Renault 2.0 NEC: Champion (2006)
24 Hours of Daytona: Overall winner (2018 and 2021), GTD Winner (2013)
Italian GT Championship - GT3: 3rd (2010)
Blancpain Endurance Series - GT3 Pro Cup : 3rd (2011)
North American Endurance Cup: Champion (2017)

Racing record

Career summary

† As Albuquerque was a guest driver, he was ineligible for points.
* Season still in progress.

Complete Eurocup Formula Renault 2.0 results
(key) (Races in bold indicate pole position) (Races in italics indicate fastest lap)

Complete Formula Renault 3.5 Series results
(key) (Races in bold indicate pole position) (Races in italics indicate fastest lap)

Complete GP2 Series results
(key) (Races in bold indicate pole position) (Races in italics indicate fastest lap)

Complete A1 Grand Prix results
(key) (Races in bold indicate pole position) (Races in italics indicate fastest lap)

Complete Deutsche Tourenwagen Masters results
(key) (Races in bold indicate pole position) (Races in italics indicate fastest lap)

Complete 24 Hours of Daytona results

Complete FIA World Endurance Championship results

* Season still in progress.

Complete 24 Hours of Le Mans results

Complete IMSA SportsCar Championship results
(key)(Races in bold indicate pole position)

* Season still in progress.

Complete European Le Mans Series results

‡ Half points awarded as less than 75% of race distance was completed.

References

External links

 
 

1985 births
Living people
Sportspeople from Coimbra
Portuguese racing drivers
GP2 Series drivers
Karting World Championship drivers
Euroformula Open Championship drivers
German Formula Renault 2.0 drivers
Formula Renault 2.0 NEC drivers
Formula Renault Eurocup drivers
A1 Team Portugal drivers
World Series Formula V8 3.5 drivers
Deutsche Tourenwagen Masters drivers
24 Hours of Daytona drivers
24 Hours of Le Mans drivers
Rolex Sports Car Series drivers
Superstars Series drivers
Blancpain Endurance Series drivers
International GT Open drivers
WeatherTech SportsCar Championship drivers
European Le Mans Series drivers
24 Hours of Spa drivers
Global RallyCross Championship drivers
FIA World Endurance Championship drivers
Arden International drivers
Stock Car Brasil drivers
A1 Grand Prix drivers
Motopark Academy drivers
Racing Engineering drivers
Epsilon Euskadi drivers
Audi Sport drivers
Team Rosberg drivers
Jota Sport drivers
W Racing Team drivers
Team Joest drivers
Starworks Motorsport drivers
Action Express Racing drivers
United Autosports drivers
Rebellion Racing drivers
Morand Racing drivers
ISR Racing drivers
Wayne Taylor Racing drivers
Saintéloc Racing drivers
Andretti Autosport drivers